The Oakhill Correctional Institution is a minimum-security Wisconsin Department of Corrections prison for males located in Oregon, Wisconsin in the United States. The prison encompasses approximately 160 acres.

History 
The building that the prison is housed in was built in 1931, but remained vacant for 10 years until it became the Oregon School For Girls. In 1976, the school was closed and converted into the Oakhill Correctional Institution. The facility is listed on the National Register of Historic Places.

External links 
https://doc.wi.gov/Pages/OffenderInformation/AdultInstitutions/OakhillCorrectionalInstitution.aspx

References 

Prisons in Wisconsin
 Buildings and structures in Dane County, Wisconsin